Chagres District  is a district (distrito) of Colón Province in Panama. The population according to the 2000 census was 9,191; the latest official estimate (for 2019) is 11,342. The district covers a total area of 445 km². The capital lies at the town of Nuevo Chagres.

Administrative divisions
Chagres District is divided administratively into the following corregimientos:

Nuevo Chagres (capital)
Achiote
El Guabo
La Encantada
Palmas Bellas
Piña
Salud

References

Districts of Colón Province